Broken Spell can refer to:

 Broken Spell (film), a 1958 Iranian film
 Broken Spell, a Power Rangers episode